Alonzo Harris (born November 9, 1992) is an American football running back who is currently a free agent of the National Football League (NFL). He was signed by the Packers as an undrafted free agent in 2015. He played college football at Louisiana–Lafayette.

Professional career

Green Bay Packers
In May 2015 Harris signed with the Green Bay Packers as an undrafted free agent. On December 3, 2015 Harris was waived after missing curfew the night before a game against the Detroit Lions.

References

External links
Green Bay Packers bio
Louisiana–Lafayette Ragin' Cajuns bio

1992 births
Living people
Players of American football from Birmingham, Alabama
American football running backs
Louisiana Ragin' Cajuns football players
Green Bay Packers players